K. P. Mohanan, is the former Kerala State Minister for Agriculture in United Democratic Front Cabinet from 18 May 2011 to 20 May 2016. He is the leader of Loktantrik Janata Dal.  He is the son of Kerala's former Minister Late Shri. P. R. Kurup and Late Smt. K.P. Leelavathy Amma; born at Puthoor near Panoor in Kannur district of Kerala on 3 March 1950. He was  the General Secretary of Socialist Janata (Democratic) Party (SJD) based in Kerala, India. SJD is part of Congress-led United Democratic Front. As a minister K. P. Mohanan had to handle portfolios of Agriculture, Soil Conservation, Soil Survey, Warehousing Corporation, Agricultural University, Animal Husbandry, Veterinary University, Printing and Stationery.

Early career, interests and family 
K.P Mohanan has completed his Pre-degree and A.M.A.E.S.I. (Aeronautical Engineering Diploma) from Nehru College, Coimbatore and then he worked as editor-in-chief for Padayani Daily, a National Socialist evening newspaper in Malayalam published from Thalassery. K.P Mohanan also worked in Qatar for a short term in his career in the field of Photography, Film processing and sales in the colour Labs named as Vegas and Salam Studio & Stores.

K.P Mohanan is still very passionate about cameras and photography. He is interested in Indian martial art Kalaripayattu. He trained Kalaripayattu from the age of five till 12. It's a sort of a family tradition for him. The legendary C.V. Narayanan Gurukkal of the world-famous CVN Kalari was his grandfather's younger brother. He is also interested in literature, farming, football, volleyball and badminton.

Wife Smt. Hemaja Mohanan is from Perambra in Kozhikode district. Children: One son, Ram Mohan and two daughters Rajila Mohan and Ramila Mohan

Achievements 
KP Mohanan won the first award instituted by Kerala NRI centre state committee for "People's MLA". The award carries Rs 10,000 and plaque. The award is being given considering the last 10 years performance in his constituency as MLA.

K. P. Mohanan represented Peringalam constituency in 2001 & 2006 Legislative assembly. In the 2011 assembly elections he won from Kuthuparamba constituency by defeating LDF independent candidate S.A Puthiyavalappil by a margin of 3303 votes. He is the Parliamentary Board Chairman of Socialist Janatha (Democratic).

Political life 
K. P. Mohanan started his political career as a member of ISO, the Student's Organization of socialist party. He held the post of state treasurer of ISO, and also actively participated in many students’ movements and agitations. He became the member of Janatha party when it is formed, and elected as the Kannur district secretary of Yuva Janatha. He became the member of National working committee of Janatha Dal and Janatha Dal State committee; He was also there in Kunnothu Paramba Gram Panchayat executive committee for 7 years. He was the president of Perigalam mandalam state fencing association and member of volleyball association and sports council.

K.P. Mohanan follows in the footsteps of his father, P.R. Kurup. P.R. Kurup had been elected from Peringalam constituency in the third, fifth, eighth, and 10th elections to the Assembly. Before that, he was elected from the Koothupramba constituency in 1957, the first Assembly elections in reorganised Kerala, and the elections that followed in 1960. He had served as Minister for Irrigation and Cooperation from 1967 to 1969 in the E. M. S. Namboodiripad Ministry and as Forest and Transport Minister from 1996 to 1999 in the E. K. Nayanar Ministry.

Though he set foot in Kerala politics under the shadow of his father, he was eventually able to make an identity of his own as a prominent leader by his hard work and shrewd tactics.

References

Loktantrik Janata Dal politicians
1950 births
Living people
Kerala MLAs 2001–2006
Kerala MLAs 2006–2011
Kerala MLAs 2011–2016
Malayali politicians
Kerala politicians
Janata Dal (United) politicians
Socialist Janata (Democratic) politicians
Janata Dal (Secular) politicians